Mount Tobias is a mountain located in the Catskill Mountains of New York southeast of Phoenicia. Ticetonyk Mountain is located south, Tremper Mountain is located northwest, Roundtop Mountain is located southeast, and Tonshi Mountain is located southeast of Mount Tobias.

References

Mountains of Ulster County, New York
Mountains of New York (state)